Mikhail Kukushkin was the defending champion but decided not to participate.
Evgeny Donskoy won the title, defeating Marsel İlhan 6–3, 6–4 in the final.

Seeds

Draw

Finals

Top half

Bottom half

References
 Main Draw
 Qualifying Draw

President's Cup (tennis)- Singles
2012 Men's Singles